Monte Brice (July 12, 1891 – November 8, 1962) was a writer, producer, and director of films in the United States.

In 1926, he was promoted from scenario writer to director and given a five-year contract with Famous Players-Lasky. A 1928 article states he had left Paramount and was freelancing.

In the later years of his decades long career in film he worked with Bob Hope. Brice was best known as gag writer who worked on Hope's radio and film scripts.

He married Doris Hill. Brice had two daughters and three grandchildren. He died in London while working with Hope on film projects.

Partial filmography
 Riders Up (1924)
Casey at the Bat (1927 film), director
Mexican Spitfire Sees a Ghost, written by Charles E. Roberts and Monte Brice
Take a Chance (1933 film), directed by Monte Brice and Laurence Schwab
Brewster's Millions (1926), screenplay by Monte Brice, Lloyd Corrigan and Harold Shumate
Hands Up! (1926 film), co-written by Monte Brice and Lloyd Corrigan
Sweet Surrender (film) (1935), director
Tillie's Punctured Romance (1928 film), co-wrote with Keene Thompson
Genius at Work (1946), co-wrote with Robert E. Kent
Pot o' Gold (film), co-wrote screenplay
The Fleet's In (1928 film), one of the writers
You'll Find Out, one of the writers
Singin' in the Corn, one of the writers
Radio Stars on Parade, co-wrote screenplay with Robert E. Kent from a story by Kent
Fireman, Save My Child (1927 film), co-wrote with Thomas J. Geraghty
Mama Loves Papa (1945 film), writer
Eadie Was a Lady (1945)	original story and screenplay 
Radio Stars on Parade (1945), screenplay
A Guy, a Gal and a Pal, story
Variety Girl (1947), screenplay
Genius at Work (1946), script

References

External links 

Rotten Tomatoes profile

1891 births
1962 deaths
American film producers
American film directors
American male screenwriters
20th-century American screenwriters